NRX (National Research Experimental) was a heavy-water-moderated, light-water-cooled, nuclear research reactor at the Canadian Chalk River Laboratories, which came into operation in 1947 at a design power rating of 10 MW (thermal), increasing to 42 MW by 1954. At the time of its construction, it was Canada's most expensive science facility and the world's most powerful nuclear research reactor.
NRX was remarkable both in terms of its heat output and the number of free neutrons it generated. When a nuclear reactor such as NRX is operating, its nuclear chain reaction generates many free neutrons. In the late 1940s, NRX was the most intense neutron source in the world.

NRX experienced one of the world's first major reactor accidents on 12 December 1952. The reactor began operation on 22 July 1947 under the National Research Council of Canada, and was taken over by Atomic Energy of Canada Limited (AECL) shortly before the 1952 accident. The accident was cleaned up and the reactor restarted within two years.  NRX operated for 45 years, then shut down permanently on 30 March 1993. Decommissioning is underway at the Chalk River Laboratories site.

NRX was the successor to Canada's first reactor, ZEEP. Because the operating life of a research reactor was not expected to be very long, in 1948 planning started for construction of a successor facility, the National Research Universal reactor, which started self-sustained operation (or "went critical") in 1957.

Design 

A heavy water moderated reactor is governed by two main processes. First, the water slows down (moderates) the neutrons which are produced by nuclear fission, increasing the chances of the high energy neutrons causing further fission reactions. Second, control rods absorb neutrons and adjust the power level or shut down the reactor in the course of normal operation. Either inserting the control rods or removing the heavy water moderator can stop the reaction.

The NRX reactor incorporated a calandria, a sealed vertical aluminium cylindrical vessel with a diameter of 8 m and height of 3 m. The core vessel held about 175 six-centimetre-diameter vertical tubes in a hexagonal lattice, 14,000 litres of heavy water and helium gas to displace air and prevent corrosion. The level of water in the reactor could be adjusted to help set the power level. Sitting in the vertical tubes and surrounded by air were fuel elements or experimental items. This design was a forerunner of the CANDU reactors.

The fuel elements contained fuel rods 3.1 m long, 31 mm in diameter and weighing 55 kg, containing uranium fuel and sheathed in aluminium. Surrounding the fuel element was an aluminium coolant tube with up to 250 litres per second of cooling water from the Ottawa River flowing through it. Between the coolant sheath and the calandria an air flow of 8 kg/second was maintained.

Twelve of the vertical tubes contained control rods made of boron carbide powder inside steel tubes. These could be raised and lowered to control the reaction, with any seven inserted being enough to absorb sufficient neutrons that no chain reaction could happen. The rods were held up by electromagnets, so that a power failure would cause them to fall into the tubes and terminate the reaction. A pneumatic system could use air pressure from above to quickly force them into the reactor core or from below to slowly raise them from it. Four of these were called the safeguard bank while the other eight were controlled in an automatic sequence. Two pushbuttons on the main panel in the control room activated magnets to seal the rods to the pneumatic system, and the pushbutton to cause the pneumatic insertion of the rods into the core was located a few feet away.

History 

 NRX was for a time the world's most powerful research reactor, vaulting Canada into the forefront of physics research. Emerging from a World War II cooperative effort between Britain, the United States, and Canada, NRX was a multipurpose research reactor used to develop new isotopes, test materials and fuels, and produce neutron radiation beams, that became an indispensable tool in the blossoming field of condensed matter physics.

The nuclear physics design of NRX emerged from the Montreal Laboratory of Canada's National Research Council, which was established at the University of Montreal during WWII to engage a team of Canadian, British, and other European scientists in top-secret heavy-water reactor research.  When the decision was made to build the NRX at what is now known as Chalk River Laboratories, the detailed engineering design was contracted to Canada's Defence Industries Limited (DIL), who subcontracted construction to Fraser Brace Ltd.

In 1994 Dr. Bertram Brockhouse shared the Nobel Prize in Physics for his work in the 1950s at NRX, which advanced the detection and analysis techniques used in the field of neutron scattering for condensed matter research.

The CIRUS reactor, based on this design, was built in India. It was ultimately used to produce plutonium for India's Operation Smiling Buddha nuclear test.

It is claimed that the term "crud" originally stood for "Chalk River Unidentified Deposit", used to describe the radioactive scaling that builds up on internal reactor components, first observed in the NRX facility.  Crud has since become common parlance for "Corrosion Related Unidentified Deposit" and similar expressions and is commonly used with no relation to the Chalk River plant.

Accident 
On December 12, 1952, the NRX reactor suffered a partial meltdown due to operator error and mechanical problems in the shut-off systems. For test purposes, some of the tubes had been disconnected from high pressure water cooling and connected by hoses to a temporary cooling system and one was cooled only by airflow.

During tests on low power, with low coolant flux through the core, the supervisor noticed several control rods being pulled from the core, and found an operator in the basement opening pneumatic valves. Wrongly opened valves were immediately closed, but some of the control rods did not reenter the core and stuck in almost withdrawn positions, but still low enough for their status lights to indicate them as lowered. Due to a miscommunication between the supervisor and the control room operator, wrong buttons were pressed when the supervisor asked for lowering the control rods into the core. Instead of sealing the withdrawn control rods to the pneumatic system, the safeguard bank of four control rods was withdrawn from the core. The operator noticed that the power level was exponentially increasing, doubling each 2 seconds, and tripped the reactor. Three of the safeguard control rods however were not inserted into the core and the fourth took an abnormally long time, about 90 seconds, to slide back, while the power kept rising. After just 10 seconds 17 MW were reached. The cooling water boiled in the tubes connected to the temporary cooling system, and some of them ruptured; the positive void coefficient of the reactor led to yet higher power increase rate. About 14 seconds later valves were opened to drain the heavy water from the calandria. As this took some time, power increased for 5 more seconds, peaked at 80 MW, then went down as the moderator level decreased and was at zero 25 seconds later. Meanwhile, some fuel elements melted and the calandria was pierced at several places; helium leaked and air was aspirated inside. Hydrogen and other gases evolved by high-temperature reaction of metals with cooling water, and 3–4 minutes later oxyhydrogen exploded in the calandria. During the incident, some gaseous fission products were vented to the atmosphere, and heavy water in the calandria was contaminated with the cooling water and the fission products.

To remove decay heat, the water cooling system was kept operating, leaking contaminated coolant to the floor.

Clean-up of the site required several months of work, partially carried out by 150 US Navy personnel who had been training in the area, including future US president Jimmy Carter. The NRX reactor core and calandria, damaged beyond repair, were removed and buried, and an improved replacement was installed; the refurbished reactor was operating again within two years. Clean up took fourteen months and included 800 Atomic Energy Comission staff and both Canadian and U.S. militaries.

The lessons learned in the 1952 accident advanced the field of reactor safety significantly, and the concepts it highlighted (diversity and independence of safety systems, guaranteed shutdown capability, efficiency of man-machine interface) became fundamentals of reactor design. The incident was the world's first nuclear reactor meltdown.

See also
 Chicago Pile-1
 Nuclear power
 Nuclear fission
 Nuclear power plant
 Nuclear waste

References

External links
 
 
 
 

1947 establishments in Ontario
1993 disestablishments in Ontario
Atomic Energy of Canada Limited
Energy infrastructure completed in 1947
Government buildings completed in 1947
Nuclear reactors
Nuclear accidents and incidents
Nuclear research reactors